The action of 3 May 1657 was a battle that took place on 3 May 1657 and was a victory for the Republic of Venice over the Ottoman fleet of Algiers. Venetian casualties were 117 killed and 346 wounded. Few details are known.

Ships involved

Venice (Mocenigo)
6  galleasses?
19  galleys?

Algiers
Perla (flag??) - Captured
Fontana Rose - Captured
Sette Teste - Aground and burnt
Doi Lioni - Aground and burnt
Luna Biscaina - Aground and burnt
Molin de Vento - Captured
Tigra - Aground and burnt
Lione
? (ex-Venetian Croce d'Oro, captured earlier that year) - Captured

References
 

Conflicts in 1657
1657
Naval battles involving Ottoman Algeria